Pressing Business is a 1915 American silent comedy film produced by the Vim Comedy Company. Incorrectly credited as an Oliver Hardy title. The Library of Congress has a complete print and Oliver Hardy does not appear in it.

Cast
 Bobby Burns as Pokes
 Walter Stull as Jabbs
 Billy Ruge		
 Frank Hanson	
 Ethel Marie Burton
 Edna Reynolds

See also
 List of American films of 1915

References

External links

1915 films
American silent short films
American black-and-white films
1915 comedy films
1915 short films
Silent American comedy films
American comedy short films
1910s American films